Vilnius Combined Heat and Power Plant or Vilnius Power Plant-3 was a power plant in Vilnius, Lithuania.

Vilnius Combined Heat and Power Plant's capacity is 603 MW heating power and 360 MW electric power. It is the most polluting electric power plant in Lithuania. As a consequence, Vilnius Combined Heat and Power Plant was closed in 2016. In 2016 a new waste-to-energy Vilnius Biofuel Power Plant was built next to the CHP plant.

References 

Energy infrastructure completed in 1983
Cogeneration power stations in Lithuania
Natural gas-fired power stations in Lithuania
Oil-fired power stations in Lithuania
Power stations in Vilnius
Power stations built in the Soviet Union